This is the Military intervention against ISIL aerial order of battle, which lists the American forces and allies aerial assets that have taken part in the Military intervention against ISIL between June 2014 and the present day.

Sea deployments

Carriers

France 
 Charles de Gaulle strike group (30 September 2016 – December 2016).
 Flottille 35F using Aérospatiale Alouette III.
 Flottille 11F using Dassault Rafale M.
Flottille 12F using Dassault Rafale M.
Flottille 36F using Eurocopter AS365 Dauphin.
Flottille 31F using NHIndustries NH90 NFH Caïman.
Flottille 33F using NHIndustries NH90 NFH Caiman.
Flottille 4F using Northrop Grumman E-2C Hawkeye.

Russia 
 Admiral Kuznetsov (8 November 2016 – January 2017 or later)
 100th Independent Shipborne Fighter Aviation Regiment using Mikoyan Mig-29KR/KUBRs.
 279th Independent Shipborne Fighter Aviation Regiment using Sukhoi Su-33s and Mikoyan MiG-29KR/KUBRs, deployed from Severomorsk-3 in the Northern Fleet
 7050th Air Base using Kamov Ka-27PS, Kamov Ka-31R and Kamov Ka-29s.
 A Test and Evaluation Unit using Kamov Ka-52Ks.

United Kingdom 

  carrier strike group 21 (June 20, 2021 - present)
 No. 617 Squadron RAF using Lockheed Martin F-35B Lightning 
 VMFA-211 (Marine Fighter Attack Squadron 211) with the F-35B Lightning
 820 Naval Air Squadron with AgustaWestland Merlin HM.2
 845 Naval Air Squadron with Merlin HC.4

United States 
  carrier strike group (June 2014 – late October 2014; February 2017 – present)
DESRON 22 using Arleigh Burke-class destroyers.
 Strike Fighter Squadron 213 (VFA-213) using Boeing F/A-18F Super Hornets
 VFA-87 using McDonnell Douglas F/A-18C Hornets.
 VFA-31 using Boeing F/A-18E Super Hornets.
 VFA-15 using McDonnell Douglas F/A-18C Hornets.
 VAQ-134 using Northrop Grumman EA-6B Prowler. (2014)
 VAQ-131 using Boeing EA-18G Growlers. (2017)
VFA-37 using McDonnel Douglas F/A-18C Hornets. (2017)
  carrier strike group (late October 2014 – late March 2015)
 DESRON 1 using Arleigh Burke-class destroyers.
 VFA-113 using McDonnell Douglas F/A-18C Hornets.
 VFA-94 using McDonnell Douglas F/A-18C Hornets.
 VFA-81 using Boeing F/A-18E Super Hornets.
 VFA-22 using Boeing F/A-18F Super Hornets.
  carrier strike group (late March 2015 – 13 October 2015)
 DESRON 2 using Arleigh Burke-class destroyers.
 VMFA-251 Marine Fighter Attack Squadron 251 (VMFA-251) "Thunderbolts" using McDonnell Douglas F/A-18C(N) Hornets. (USMC Unit)
 VFA-211 using Boeing F/A-18F Super Hornets.
 VFA-136 using Boeing F/A-18E Super Hornets.
 VFA-11 using Boeing F/A-18F Super Hornets.
  carrier strike group (December 2015 – July 2016)
 DESRON 28 using Arleigh Burke-class destroyers.
 VFA-25 using Boeing F/A-18E Super Hornets.
 VFA-83 using McDonnell Douglas F/A-18C Hornets.
 VFA-103 using Boeing F/A-18F Super Hornets.
 VFA-143 using Boeing F/A-18E Super Hornets.
  carrier strike group (June 2016 – 26 December 2016)
 DESRON 26 using Arleigh Burke-class destroyers.
 VFA-32 using Boeing F/A-18F Super Hornets.
 VFA-86 using McDonnell Douglas F/A-18E Hornets.
 VFA-105 using Boeing F/A-18E Super Hornets.
 VFA-131 using Boeing F/A-18C Hornets.
 VAW-123 using Northrop Grumman E-2 Hawkeyes.
VAQ-130 using Boeing EA-18G Growlers.
 VRC-40 using Grumman C-2 Greyhounds.
 HSC-7 using Sikorsky MH-60S Knighthawks.
 HSM-74 using Sikorsky MH-60R Seahawks.
  carrier strike group (November 22, 2019 – present)
 Carrier Air Wing Seven (CVW-7)
 VFA-25 using Boeing F/A-18E Super Hornets.
 VFA-86 using Boeing F/A-18E Super Hornets.
 VFA-103 using Boeing F/A-18F Super Hornets.
 VFA-143 using Boeing F/A-18F Super Hornets.
 VAQ-140 using EA-18G Growler
 VAW-121 using E-2D Advanced Hawkeye
 HSC-5 using MH-60S Seahawk
 HSM-79 using MH-60R Seahawk
 VRC-40 Detachment 3 using C-2A Greyhound

Amphibious assault ships

United States 
  until October 2015.
  between December 2015 and June 2016.
 Marine Medium Tiltrotor Squadron 162 (Reinforced) (VMM-162 REIN)
 McDonnell Douglas AV-8B Harrier II - VMA-223
  between June and December 2016.
 VMM-264 (VMM-264 REIN) using Bell AH-1W SuperCobra and McDonnell Douglas AV-8B Harrier IIs.
  from 1 December 2016.
 VMM-163 (VMM-163 REIN) with Bell Boeing MV-22 Osprey, McDonnell Douglas AV-8B Harrier II and Sikorsky CH-53E Super Stallions.
  until September 2017.
 VMM-365 (VMM-365 REIN) with MV-22 Osprey's.
  until February 2019.
 Marine Fighter Attack Squadron 211 (VMFA-211) with Lockheed Martin F-35B Lightning II.

Land bases

Aircraft at unknown land bases

Bahrain

Isa Air Base 
Units based out of Isa Air Base are part of the 379th Air Expeditionary Wing (379 AEW).

Iran

Hamadan Airbase (Nojeh)

Iraq

Al Asad Airbase

(1st Expeditionary Rescue Group)

Baghdad

Al-Harir Air Base

Logistical Support Area Roberts (Erbil)

Qayyarah Airfield West 
The 821st Contingency Response Group was based at Qayyarah from mid-October 2016 until March 2017 when the 370th Air Expeditionary Advisory Group arrived.

Camp Taji 
Units have been based at Camp Taji since May 2016.

Italy

Naval Air Station Sigonella

Jordan

Muwaffaq Salti Air Base 
Also known as Al Azraq - 332 AEW/407th Air Expeditionary Group

Prince Hassan Air Base

Kuwait

Al Mubarak Air Base

Ahmad al-Jaber Air Base 
(386 AEW/332 AEW/407th Air Expeditionary Group)

Ali Al Salem Air Base 
(386 AEW)

Qatar

Al Udeid Air Base 
(379 AEW & No. 83 EAG RAF)

Russia

Mozdok air base

Syria

Khmeimim airbase 
(Latakia Air Base) (Special Purpose Aviation Brigade)

Shayrat Air Base/Shariat

Tias

Turkey

Diyarbakir Air Base 
(39th Air Base Wing)

Incirlik Air Base

(39th Air Base Wing/332 AEW/447th Air Expeditionary Group)

Forward Operating Base Konya

United Arab Emirates

Al Dhafra Air Base

(380 AEW)

Al Minhad Air Base

Akrotiri and Dhekelia (UK)

RAF Akrotiri

See also
 Operation Inherent Resolve, name for American operations
 Operation Okra, name for Australian operations
 Operation Shader, name for British operations
 Operation Impact, name for Canadian operations
 Opération Chammal, name for French operations
 Operation Counter Daesh, name for German operations
Commander headquarters of ongoing operations:
  Combined Joint Task Force – Operation Inherent Resolve

References

Citations

Bibliography

War in Iraq (2013–2017)